Albert James Wohlstetter (December 19, 1913 – January 10, 1997) was an American political scientist noted for his influence on U.S. nuclear strategy during the Cold War. He and his wife Roberta Wohlstetter, an accomplished historian and intelligence expert, received the Presidential Medal of Freedom from Ronald Reagan on November 7, 1985.

Early life and education
Albert Wohlstetter was born on 19 December 1913, the fourth and youngest child of Philip Wohlstetter and Nellie (née Friedman). His paternal grandparents were cosmopolitan Jews who immigrated to the United States from the Austro-Hungarian Empire in the latter half of the nineteenth century. Albert's father, Philip, was born in the United States about twenty years later. Albert's older siblings were William (1902–1967), Helene (1906–1974) and Charles (1910–1995). Albert's brother Charles was an accomplished businessman who would help Albert get his start as a young man. Charles also employed Helene at one of his companies, ConTel, where she was killed in a shooting by a disgruntled employee in 1974.

The Wohlstetters lived in the Washington Heights neighborhood of Manhattan. After attending the City College of New York, Philip Wohlstetter became an attorney and served as chief counsel to the Metropolitan Opera. In 1912, he founded one of the early phonograph companies, the Rex Talking Machine Corporation. Luminaries of the performance world were regular guests in the Wohlstetter home. The Rex company was taken over and its Wilmington, Delaware factory converted to war production during the World War I. Philip died of a heart attack in 1918 when Albert was four years old.

City College of New York
Wohlstetter started at City College of New York in 1931 through a scholarship in modern dance, earning a B.A. in 1934. At the time he was involved in radical politics, and was a member of the League for a Revolutionary Workers Party, a Trotskyist splinter group, in the mid-1930s.

Columbia University
Wohlstetter started at Columbia Law School on a fellowship in 1934. It was in a class there that he met Roberta Morgan. Wohlstetter was bored by law school and left the program after only one year. He stayed at Columbia to pursue a Ph.D. in mathematical logic and the philosophy of science where he studied under Abraham Wald and was a peer of Jacob Wolfowitz. After a thesis titled Language and Empiricism earned him an M.A. in June 1937, several fellowships allowed him to work on his dissertation. He had a fellowship with the Social Science Research Council on a project to incorporate modern mathematical methods into economics and business cycle research. From 1941 to 1942 he was a research associate at the National Bureau of Economic Research.

In August 1942 the Wohlstetters vacationed with Dwight Macdonald, one of the editors of Partisan Review, and his wife, Nancy in Nantucket.

He left Columbia's graduate program to work for the U.S. government on war planning during World War II and never completed his doctorate.

Early career
During the Second World War, Wohlstetter worked on problems of war production. He was first hired by the Planning Committee of the War Production Board. It is unclear how he ended up there. In an interview, Wohlstetter says that while on the Carnegie associateship with NBER, Simon Kuznets was hired by Robert R. Nathan and it was Kuznets who hired Wohlstetter. Albert's brother Charles recounts that it was Arthur F. Burns who gave Albert the job.

Later he worked at Atlas Aircraft Products Company.

After the war, Wohlstetter worked briefly in business in New York. He moved back to Washington, D.C. to serve as the Director of Programs for the National Housing Agency (USHA) in 1946 and 1947, the only time in his career he was a federal employee. At the USHA Wohlstetter worked with Paul Weidlinger, an engineer who had worked during the war for an aircraft company owned by Albert's brother, Charles, designing modular buildings such as airplane hangars that could be assembled quickly. At the USHA Wohlstetter and Weidlinger worked on applying such principles to domestic residential buildings.

During the 1937–1938 school year, Roberta had worked as a teaching assistant at the University of Southern California, during which time she became enamored with the California lifestyle. At her urging, and with his brother Charles helping to secure a job for Albert, the Wohlstetters moved to Santa Monica in 1947. Albert went to work for the General Panel Corporation to "tool up" their industrial plant. General Panel Corporation was a company founded by Walter Gropius and Konrad Wachsmann, two important figures in the Bauhaus movement.

RAND Corporation
While on a walk, Albert and Roberta ran into Abe Girschick, Olaf Helmer and Chen McKinsey on the street in Santa Monica. Albert knew the three from his days as a student and in government service. The three mathematicians "... were overjoyed to see us. Mathematical logic was a very, very small world. There were only a little over a dozen mathematical logicians before the war in the United States ..." Girschick, Helmer and McKinsey were working at the recently formed RAND Corporation. With their help, Hans Speier, the head of the RAND social science division, hired Roberta, initially to write book abstracts for circulation to the RAND staff. When General Panel Corporation finally went out of business in 1951, Albert wanted to return to academia in the east, but Roberta was intent on remaining in California. She set up a meeting between Albert and Charles J. Hitch, the head of the RAND economics department. The two hit it off and Wohlstetter was brought on as a consultant to the Mathematics Department.

Wohlstetter remained a consultant with RAND for the first few years. It was not until June or July 1953, a few months after he began briefing Selection and Use of Strategic Air Bases to the Air Force that Hitch finally insisted that his consultant status was "absurd" and that he join the permanent staff.

At RAND, he researched how to posture and operate U.S. strategic nuclear forces to deter plausible forms of Soviet nuclear-armed aggression in way that was credible, cost-effective and controllable.

Wohlstetter's The Delicate Balance of Terror (1958) was highly influential in shaping the thinking of the Washington foreign policy establishment, particularly in its emphasis on the looming threat of Soviet attack.

During this period, Wohlstetter's relationship with fellow RAND strategist Bernard Brodie grew increasingly acrimonious. In 1963, Brodie accused Wohlstetter of a security violation and financial malfeasance. Wohlstetter had shared a draft RAND paper by Constantin Melnik with Henry Rowen, then one of the Whiz Kids working as the Deputy Assistant Secretary of Defense for International Security Affairs under Robert McNamara. Brodie also claimed that Wohlstetter was extravagant in wining and dining clients and colleagues using RAND funds. Wohlstetter defended himself by pointing out that the Melnik paper was only a "D" designated document, RAND's lowest level classification, and as a former RAND employee who had collaborated extensively with Wohlstetter on some of his most important studies, Rowen was authorized to receive the paper. Nevertheless, RAND Director Frank Collbohm demanded that Wohlstetter submit his resignation. When Wohlstetter refused, Collbohm fired him, but agreed to let Wohlstetter stay on at RAND long enough to find another job.

University of Chicago
At the suggestion of Hans Morgenthau and with his help, Wohlstetter secured a position as a professor of political science at the University of Chicago.

In the 1960s and 1970s, he expanded the scope of his research to include alliance policy and nuclear nonproliferation, ballistic missile defense, innovation in military technology, peacetime military competitions, and military potential and economics of civil nuclear energy.

In the 1980s, Wohlstetter frequently criticized proponents of mutual assured destruction who supported targeting of nuclear weapons on civilians and cities instead over enemy combatants and military forces.

Wohlstetter and his wife, Roberta Wohlstetter, also counseled both Democratic and Republican administrations, including advisers to President John F. Kennedy during the Cuban Missile Crisis in 1962.  They received the Presidential Medal of Freedom from Ronald Reagan on November 7, 1985.

During his long career, Wohlstetter also taught at UCLA and the University of California, Berkeley, in the early 1960s. From 1964 to 1980, he taught in the political science department of the University of Chicago, and chaired the dissertation committees of Paul Wolfowitz, Efraim Inbar and Zalmay Khalilzad.  He is often credited with influencing a number of prominent members of the neoconservative movement, including Richard Perle (who, as a teenager, dated Wohlstetter's daughter Joan).  He is the uncle of John Wohlstetter, author of Sleepwalking with the Bomb and The Long War Ahead and The Short War Upon Us.

Death
On 16 December 1996, his 83rd birthday, Wohlstetter was not feeling well. He and Roberta thought he was just ill or having an asthma attack. Over the telephone from New York their daughter Joan reviewed the symptoms for a heart attack and told Roberta to call an ambulance. Albert made a fuss, not wanting to go to the emergency room. At the hospital he was diagnosed as having had a serious heart attack and was discharged home with around-the-clock nursing care. In the living room he set up a makeshift chair  that allowed him to partially recline so he could continue to work. A month later, on 10 January 1997, Wohlstetter died at his Laurel Canyon home.

A memorial was held at the office of the RAND Corporation and a month later Senator Jon Kyl and special guest Richard Perle conducted a brief remembrance in the Senate chamber. Albert Wohlstetter is buried at Westwood Village Memorial Park Cemetery in Los Angeles. Roberta Wolstetter died on 6 January 2007.

Awards

He was twice awarded the Department of Defense Medal for Distinguished Public Service, first by Robert McNamara in February 1965 and again by Donald Rumsfeld in November 1976. He is the first recipient not employed by the Department of Defense and the first person awarded it twice.

On 7 November 1985 President Reagan awarded Albert Wohlstetter, along with his wife Roberta Wohlstetter and Paul Nitze, the Presidential Medal of Freedom.

Legacy
The Albert J. and Roberta Wohlstetter Papers are available at the Hoover Institution Archives at Stanford University.

In popular culture
Wohlstetter served as one of the inspirations for Stanley Kubrick's film, Dr. Strangelove or: How I Learned to Stop Worrying and Love the Bomb. In 1962, Kubrick was looking for his next project after Lolita and started reading intensively on nuclear issues. One of Kubrick's early ideas was to make a realistic thriller, titled after Wohlstetter's "Delicate Balance of Terror". But Kubrick could not conceive of a realistic scenario for an accidental nuclear war, so turned instead to the idea of making a comedy. The character of Dr. Strangelove is a composite of numerous people associated with RAND that besides Wohlstetter included Herman Kahn, John von Neumann, Wernher von Braun, and Edward Teller.

References

Bibliography

Works by Wohlstetter

For a more complete list of the works of Albert Wohlstetter, see the Albert Wohlstetter Bibliography at the Nonproliferation Policy Education Center's AlbertWohlstetter.com website.

Government and research institute reports
 
 
 
 
 
 
 
 
 

Essays
 
 
 
 
 
 
 
 
 
 
 
 
 
 
 
 
 
 
 
 
 
 
 

Interviews
 
 
 

Collected works

Additional Sources

External links 
 Online library of Wohlstetter's works at the RAND Corporation
 Register of the Albert J. and Roberta Wohlstetter Papers, Hoover Institution Archives, Stanford University, Stanford, Calif.
 Albert Wohlstetter Dot Com, a website that examines the careers and writings of the late Albert and Roberta Wohlstetter.
 
 
 Julius Shulman photographs of Josef Van der Kar's Wohlstetter House at The J. Paul Getty Trust
Register of the Albert J. and Roberta Wohlstetter Papers and selected documents online at the Hoover Institution Archives, Stanford University.

1913 births
1997 deaths
American people of Austrian-Jewish descent
City College of New York alumni
RAND Corporation people
Nuclear strategists
Neoconservatism
Mathematical logicians
University of Chicago faculty
American political scientists
Presidential Medal of Freedom recipients
Columbia Law School alumni
Social Science Research Council
Former Marxists
20th-century political scientists
Columbia Graduate School of Arts and Sciences alumni